Jamie Thomas (born 21 October 1985) is an Antiguan international footballer who plays club football for  Bassa Sports Club as a midfielder.

Career
Valcin has played club football for  Bassa Sports Club since 2003/04

He made his international debut for Antigua and Barbuda in 2006, and has appeared in FIFA World Cup qualifying matches.

International goals
Scores and results list Antigua and Barbuda's goal tally first.

References

1985 births
Living people
Antigua and Barbuda footballers
Antigua and Barbuda international footballers

Association football midfielders